Music Box is the second album released by R&B singer Evelyn "Champagne" King by RCA Records in 1979. It was produced by Theodore Life, Bill Greene and Sam Peake.  It's also noted for featuring Luther Vandross on background vocals.

History
The album peaked at #12 on the R&B albums chart. It also reached #35 on the Billboard 200. It produced the singles "Music Box" and "Out There". The album was certified gold by the RIAA. The album was digitally remastered and reissued on CD with bonus tracks in 2011 by Funky Town Grooves Records.

Track listing

Charts

Singles

References

External links

1979 albums
Evelyn "Champagne" King albums
RCA Records albums